Arthur Bosua (born 26 January 1996) is a South African soccer player who plays as a forward for South Georgia Tormenta in the USL League One.

Early life and education

Bosua grew up in Johannesburg, South Africa before moving to Dix Hills, New York as a child where he played soccer at Half Hollow Hills West High School and for Albertson Academy. While at Half Hollow Hills West, he was an All-League, Division, and County player, as well as Rookie of the Year in soccer. Bosua was ranked as a four-star recruit by Top Drawer Soccer. He committed to play college soccer at Columbia University on 19 June 2013.

Bosua attended Columbia University, where he played college soccer as a forward for the Columbia Lions from 2014–2017, tallying a total of 27 goals and 12 assists in 63 appearances. During his time at Columbia, Bosua was an Ivy League Champion, a Second Team All-American, a two-time Ivy League Offensive Player of the Year, and a three-time First Team All-Ivy honoree.

While in college, he played in the PDL with the Long Island Rough Riders.

Professional career
After his senior season, Bosua was one of 60 college players invited to the 2018 MLS Combine. He was not selected by a team in the 2018 MLS SuperDraft. A year after going un-drafted, Bosua went on trial with the Charleston Battery of the USL. After a successful trial, he signed his first professional soccer contract with the Charleston Battery in March 2019.

Bosua made his professional debut on 9 March 2019, coming on as a 75th minute substitute in a 1–1 tie against the Ottawa Fury. He made his first professional start and scored his first professional goal on 19 April 2019, in a 3–1 victory against Nashville SC.

In May 2021, Bosua joined National Independent Soccer Association side New Amsterdam FC.

On 21 February 2022, Bosua signed with USL League One club South Georgia Tormenta ahead of their 2022 season.

Honors

Individual 
 Ivy League Offensive Player of the Year: 2016, 2017 
 NSCAA All-East Region First Team: 2016, 2017
 First Team All-Ivy: 2015, 2016, 2017
 NSCAA Second Team All-American: 2017

Club 
 Columbia
 2016 Ivy League Champion

References

External links
 
 Profile at Columbia University
 

1996 births
Living people
Columbia Lions men's soccer players
Long Island Rough Riders players
Charleston Battery players
New Amsterdam FC players
Tormenta FC players
USL League Two players
USL Championship players
USL League One players
National Independent Soccer Association players
South African soccer players
Association football forwards
Soccer players from New York (state)
People from Dix Hills, New York
Sportspeople from Suffolk County, New York
South African emigrants to the United States
Soccer players from Johannesburg